The Dicionário Houaiss da Língua Portuguesa (Houaiss Dictionary of the Portuguese Language) is a major reference dictionary for the Portuguese language, edited by Brazilian writer Antônio Houaiss.

The dictionary was composed by a team of two hundred lexicographers from several countries. The project started in 1986 and was finished in 2000, one year after Houaiss's death.

The book claims to be the most complete Portuguese dictionary to date, with around 228,500 entries, 376,500 senses, 415,500 synonyms, 26,400 antonyms, and 57,000 historical words. It aims to cover all variants of the language, including African, Brazilian, and European Portuguese.

See also
Novo Dicionário da Língua Portuguesa

External links
Official website

Portuguese dictionaries